Cheema is a village in Batala in Gurdaspur district of Punjab State, India. The village is administrated by Sarpanch an elected representative of the village.

Demography 
, The village has a total number of 597 houses and the population of 3371 of which 1777 are males while 1594 are females according to the report published by Census India in 2011. The literacy rate of the village is 72.92%, lower than the state average of 75.84%. The population of children under the age of 6 years is 339 which is 10.06% of total population of the village, and child sex ratio is approximately 687 lower than the state average of 846.

See also
List of villages in India

References 

Villages in Gurdaspur district